The Lake Miwok language is a moribund (or possibly extinct) language of Northern California, traditionally spoken in an area adjacent to the Clear Lake. It is one of the languages of the Clear Lake Linguistic Area, along with Patwin, East and Southeastern Pomo, and Wappo.

Phonology

Vowels

Consonants

The consonant inventory of Lake Miwok differs substantially from the inventories found in the other Miwok languages. Where the other languages only have one series of plosives, Lake Miwok has four: plain, aspirated, ejective and voiced. Lake Miwok has also added the  affricates č, c, čʼ, cʼ, ƛʼ and the liquids r and ł. These sounds appear to have been borrowed through loanwords from other, unrelated languages in the Clear Lake area, after which they spread to some native Lake Miwok words.

Grammar
The word order of Lake Miwok is relatively free, but SOV (subject–object–verb) is the most common order.

Verb morphology

Pronominal clitics

In her Lake Miwok grammar, Callaghan reports that one speaker distinguishes between 1st person dual inclusive ʔoc and exclusive ʔic. Another speaker also remembers that this distinction used to be made by older speakers.

Noun morphology

Case inflection
Nouns can be inflected for ten different cases:
 the Subjective case marks a noun which functions as the subject of a verb. If the subject noun is placed before the verb, the Subjective has the allomorph -n after vowel (or a vowel followed by /h/), and -Ø after consonants. If it is placed after the verb, the Subjective is -n after vowels and -nu after consonants.

 the Possessive case is -n after vowels and -Ø after consonants

 the Objective case marks a noun which functions as the object of a verb. It has the allomorph -u (after a consonant) or -Ø (after a vowel) when the noun is placed immediately before a verb which contains the 2nd person prefix ʔin- (which then has the allomorph -n attached to the noun preceding the verb; compare the example below) or does not contain any subject prefix at all.

It has the allomorph -Ø before a verb containing any other subject prefix:

If the object noun does not immediately precede the verb, or if the verb is in the imperative, the allomorph of the Objective is -uc:

 the allative case is -to or -t depending on the environment. It has a variety of meaning, but often expresses direction towards a goal.
 the locative case -m gives a less specific designation of locality than the Allative, and occurs more rarely.
 the ablative case is -mu or -m depending on the context, and marks direction out of, or away from, a place.
 the instrumental case -ṭu marks instruments, e.g. tumáj-ṭu "(I hit him) with a stick".
 the comitative case -ni usually translates as "along with", but can also be used to coordinate nouns, as in kaʔunúu-ni ka ʔáppi-ni "my mother and my father".
 the vocative case only occurs with a few kinship terms, e.g. ʔunúu "mother" from ʔúnu "mother".
 the Appositive case is the citation form of nouns.

Possessive clitics
Lake Miwok uses pronominal clitics to indicate the possessor of a noun. Except for the 3d person singular, they have the same shape as the nominative pronominal clitics, but show no allomorphy.

The reflexive hana forms have the same referent as the subject of the same clause, whereas the non-reflexive forms have a different referent, e.g.:
hana háju ʔúṭe – "He sees his own dog"
ʔiṭi háju ʔúṭe – "He sees (somebody else's) dog"

Notes

References

 
 
 
 
 Callaghan, Catherine A. "Note of Lake Miwok Numerals." International Journal of American Linguistics, vol. 24, no. 3 (1958): 247.
 Keeling, Richard. "Ethnographic Field Recordings at Lowie Museum of Anthropology," 1985. Robert H. Lowie Museum of Anthropology, University of California, Berkeley. v. 2. North-Central California: Pomo, Wintun, Nomlaki, Patwin, Coast Miwok, and Lake Miwok Indians
 Lake Miwok Indians. "Rodriguez-Nieto Guide" Sound Recordings (California Indian Library Collections), LA009. Berkeley: California Indian Library Collections, 1993. "Sound recordings reproduced from the Language Archive sound recordings at the Language Laboratory, University of California, Berkeley." In 2 containers.

External links
Lake Miwok language overview at the Survey of California and Other Indian Languages
Lake Miwok audio recordings at the California Language Archive  (login required)

OLAC resources in and about the Lake Miwok language
Lake Miwok basic lexicon at the Global Lexicostatistical Database

Utian languages
Miwok
History of Lake County, California